The 1964 Diamond "D" Championship the Canadian women's curling championship was held from February 24 to 28, 1964 at the Sportex in Edmonton, Alberta.

Team British Columbia, who was skipped by Ina Hansen won the event by finishing the round robin with an 8–1 record. This was British Columbia's second championship, with their previous title coming two years earlier in 1962, which was also skipped by Hansen. Hansen became the first skip in Canadian women's curling championship history to have won two championships.

Both Alberta and Nova Scotia finished tied for second with 6–3 records, necessitating a tiebreaker playoff for second place. Alberta would go on to beat Nova Scotia 7-4 in the tiebreaker to capture runner-up honors.

The Newfoundland rink had the dubious distinction of becoming the first team ever to finish round robin play winless.

Teams
The teams are listed as follows:

Round robin standings
Final Round Robin standings

Round robin results
All draw times are listed in Mountain Standard Time (UTC−07:00).

Draw 1 
Monday, February 24, 3:00 pm

Draw 2 
Monday, February 24, 8:00 pm

Draw 3 
Tuesday, February 25, 9:00 am

Draw 4 
Tuesday, February 25, 8:00 pm

Draw 5 
Wednesday, February 26, 10:30 am

Draw 6 
Wednesday, February 26, 3:00 pm

Draw 7 
Wednesday, February 26, 8:00 pm

Draw 8 
Thursday, February 27, 9:00 am

Draw 9 
Thursday, February 27, 8:00 pm

Tiebreaker
Friday, February 28, 9:00 am

References

Diamond D Championship, 1964
Scotties Tournament of Hearts
Curling competitions in Edmonton
Diamond D Championship
Diamond D Championship
Diamond D Championship
Diamond D Championship